Elaine McMillion Sheldon  is an American documentary filmmaker, best known for her documentary, Heroin(e) for which she received Academy Award for Best Documentary Short Subject nomination with husband Kerrin Sheldon at the 90th Academy Awards.

Filmography
 2018: Recovery Boys (Documentary)
 2017: Waking the Sleeping Giant: The Making of a Political Revolution (camera operator)
 2017: 11/8/16 (Documentary) 
 2017: Heroin(e) (Documentary short) 
 2017: Timberline (Short) 
 2017: Betting on Trump: Coal (Documentary short)  
 2015: Forager (Documentary short) (completed) 
 2013: For Seamus (Documentary short) 
 2013: Hollow: An Interactive Documentary (Documentary)  
 2012: The Lower 9: A Story of Home (Documentary)  
 2011: Lincoln County Massacre (Documentary)

References

External links
  
 

Living people
American women film producers
American women film directors
American writers
American women cinematographers
Peabody Award winners
American cinematographers
American women film editors
Year of birth missing (living people)
American film editors
21st-century American women